Albert Wood was a rugby union footballer who played in the 1880s. He played at representative level for England, and at club level for Halifax, as a forward, e.g. front row, lock, or back row. Prior to Tuesday 27 August 1895, Halifax was a rugby union club.

Background
Albert Wood died in Australia.

Playing career

International honours
Albert Wood won a cap for England while at Halifax in 1884 against Ireland.

References

External links
Search for "Wood" at rugbyleagueproject.org

England international rugby union players
English rugby union players
Halifax R.L.F.C. players
Place of birth missing
Rugby union forwards
Year of birth missing
Year of death missing